ThanksKilling is a 2007 American independent black comedy slasher film written and directed by Jordan Downey, and co-written by Brad Schulz, Tony Wilson, Grant Yaffee, and Kevin Stewart. It was followed by a 2012 sequel titled ThanksKilling 3, the $112,248 budget of which was raised through a Kickstarter campaign.

Plot 
At the first Thanksgiving in 1621, a topless Pilgrim is chased and slain with a tomahawk wielded by an evil demonic turkey, which quips, "Nice tits, bitch!"

Centuries later, five college students (good girl Kristen, jock Johnny, ditzy Ali, redneck Billy, and nerdy Darren) head home for Thanksgiving with their families. After Kristen calls her father, the local sheriff, the car overheats in Crawberg (formerly Crawl Berg). This forces the quintet to camp out for the night. As they are setting up, Darren tells the settler-era folktale of Feathercloud, a Native American shaman who was dishonored by hedonistic pilgrim Chuck Langston, one of Billy's ancestors. The outraged Feathercloud used necromancy to create Turkie, who is said to appear every five-hundred and five years to slaughter all Caucasians he encounters.

Elsewhere, a dog owned by a hermit named Oscar urinates on a miniature totem pole, desecrating it, and releasing Turkie prematurely and urinating on him as well.  Angry, Turkie kills the dog, prompting Oscar to swear vengeance as Turkie runs off, and scares Kristen. Kristen tells the others about her run-in with Turkie, but they laugh off her story, until a baby rabbit (which appears to have been pecked to death) is thrown into their campfire. The next day, Turkie flags down a vehicle, and when the driver sexually propositions him, Turkie responds by shooting the man in the head and hijacking his car. By nightfall, the students reach their respective homes, and while Johnny tries to reconnect with his estranged father, Turkie attacks him. Johnny's parents are killed, but he escapes, and rejoins his friends with the exception of Ali, who is having sex with her boyfriend, Greg. Turkie walks in on the lovers, slits Greg's throat, and rapes an unaware Ali before snapping her neck.

After finding Ali's remains, the students decide to go to Kristen's house, to see if her father has any books about Turkie in his library. Turkie beats them there, tricking Kristen's father (who is dressed as a turkey for an upcoming pageant) into letting him in by wearing Groucho glasses. As they wait for Kristen, Turkie and the sheriff share an awkward snack, which ends when Turkie murders the sheriff after he mistakes him for a duck. Kristen and her friends arrive, and are allowed in by Turkie, who has donned the sheriff's severed face as a disguise. Darren finds a book about Turkie, and it mentions he can be killed if his magic talisman is removed, though the rest of the passage about how to destroy him is written in code. Billy stumbles onto Turkie disposing of the sheriff's body, and while he and the others succeed in getting the talisman, Turkie gets away.

Billy storms off while Darren cracks the code in the book, discovering that Turkie must be burned at the stake after a demonic prayer is said backwards. Outside, Turkie magically enters Billy's body, and forces his way out. Billy dies in Darren's arms as they reminisce about all the good times they had together. Darren, Kristen, and Johnny track Turkie to his tipi and say the prayer, but as they prepare to burn him he runs outside, and is shot by Oscar. Oscar leaves, and the others go to Kristen's house, unaware that the dumpster Turkie was blasted into contains radioactive waste, which reanimates him.

Believing that Turkie is dead, the surviving teens go back to Kristen's house. While Johnny and Kristen admit their feelings for each other, Darren awkwardly goes to the kitchen to get a snack. There, Turkie rips Darren's tongue and heart out. Johnny goes to find Darren in the kitchen, Turkie stabs Johnny with an electric knife. Kristen slaps Turkie and runs to a shed with a badly wounded Johnny. Turkie has chased her, but Kristen sets Turkie on fire with an aerosol flamethrower, and while he burns to death Johnny dies from the electric carver stab. Kristen grabs a pipe and knocks him into a pile of wood. Oscar congratulates her and she eats Turkie's legs. Later, at a family's Thanksgiving dinner, the cooked turkey comes to life, and in Turkie's voice yells, "Do I smell sequel, biotch?!"

Cast

Production 

ThanksKilling was shot on a budget of $3,500 in the summer of 2006, and released on DVD in 2009.

Reception 

ThanksKilling was called "cheerily awful" by Tom Russo of The Boston Globe. Mark Hughes of Forbes stated, "It's a comedy-horror movie, but even the humor is awful. But it's so darn awful that it doesn't even need Mystery Science Theater 3000 voice-over jokes to be entertainingly terrible. If you can enjoy laughing at a bad movie, definitely add this one to your list". DVD Verdict's Gordon Sullivan responded well to the film, writing, "In some ways there's nothing special about ThanksKilling—it's a typical slasher-style creature-feature where a group of college kids are menaced by a holiday themed killer who spouts one liners. However, ThanksKilling knows how to tickle the low-budget funny bone in particularly effective ways" and "The film itself is a campy low-budget horror flick that gets in and out in little over an hour, delivering the goods all the while. The extras are a little slight, but overall, this disc should please genre fans". In a negative review from The Badger Herald, Peter Culver writes, "Ultimately, there’s not much else to say about this mountainous pile of garbage. There’s more entertaining bad movies, there’s better movies about unlikely murderous animals and there’s better Thanksgiving movies. For your own sake, please just don’t".

Musical adaptation 
A musical adaptation of the film, titled ThanksKilling: The Musical, was created by Jeff Thomson, Jordan Mann and David Eck, premiered in Seattle in 2013, and off off-broadway at The Producers Club as part of the Festival of the Offensive in 2014, with Diana Huey, Gabriel Violett, Abe Goldfarb, Marissa Rosen, Jillian Gottlieb, David Errigo Jr., Mike Daly and Evan Woltz, Dad's Garage (Atlanta, GA 2015), Columbus, OH (2016) with Ryan Francis reprising his on-screen roll of Darren, with an additional showing at the 2017 Orlando International Fringe Theater Festival.

References

External links 

 
 

2008 films
Films about magic
American slasher films
American monster movies
Camcorder films
Films set in 1621
2000s teen films
2008 horror films
Films set in Ohio
Films shot in Ohio
American films about revenge
American supernatural horror films
Mass murder in fiction
Horror films about birds
2008 comedy horror films
American independent films
American teen horror films
American comedy horror films
Films about Native Americans
Puppet films
American films with live action and animation
Films set in the 2000s
Thanksgiving horror films
2008 directorial debut films
2008 comedy films
2008 independent films
2000s English-language films
2000s American films
Supernatural slasher films
American black comedy films
Slasher comedy films
American splatter films
American exploitation films